Unendlich (German for "never ending") may refer to:

Albums
Unendlich (Matthias Reim album) (2013)
Unendlich (Schandmaul album) (2014)

Songs
Songs named "Unendlich" appear on the following albums:
I Luciferi by Danzig (2002)
Laut Gedacht by Silbermond (2006)
Des Wahnsinns fette Beute by Oomph! (2012)
Herz Kraft Werke by Sarah Connor (2019)

See also
Die Unendliche Geschichte (film)